The "Virtual Globe" was the method of creating the BBC1 symbol that was used between 16 February 1991 and 4 October 1997.

Launch
The Virtual Globe replaced the COW on 16 February 1991 and was designed by Martin Lambie-Nairn, owner of the Lambie-Nairn design agency. The first aspects of the look were first witnessed at 6am, when the updated Open University symbol first aired, showing the stylised '1'. This was followed at 8am by the new clock that accompanied the look, introducing a news bulletin. The first time the ident itself aired was at 9am, when it introduced Going Live!, the Saturday morning magazine show on Children's BBC, where the ident itself was "unveiled" by presenters Phillip Schofield and Sarah Greene.

Components of Look

Regular Idents
The ident consisted of a figure "1" inside a rotating transparent globe surrounded by a swirling smoky atmosphere above the BBC's corporate logo: the bold italic letters B B C within three rhomboids, above blue red and green flashes. The idents were created by filming a physical globe, but used CGI effects to give it its smokey look. The ident had no soundtrack and was played off a Sony Laserdisc implementation, Sony CRVdisc. Upon first impressions, the ident does not appear like a globe, as the smoky CGI effects hide and disfigure the continents. However, land masses can be seen in the globe and their shadows can be seen on the background of the ident.

A clock accompanied the look, which used GNAT (Generator of Network Analogue Time), resulting in the clock mimicked the movement of an analogue clock by moving the minute hand every second, rather than every 15 seconds as was found on previous station clocks. The counters on the clocks alternated between dots and dashes pointing towards the centre, a smoky static background and included the BBC logo at the bottom of the screen, although no on screen reference to the channel being BBC1. The clock was originally large to fit the screen best, however the size contrast between the clock and the globe resulted in difficulty at closedown, as the two do not fade easily. This issue was resolved in November 1991, when the clock was shrunk down to the same as the globe, easing fading between. The background was also altered to a ripple effect, yet retaining the smoky feel.

The look also featured an updated style of captions and promotions. Promotions featured the '1' above a BBC logo in the top left of the screen, with the end screen of promotions featuring the programme name at the bottom of the screen. Captions were similar, being formed of a sidebar with the '1' and BBC logo in top left corner with the background of the sidebar featuring a smoky background similar to the ident.

Christmas Idents

Replacement
The ident set was replaced following a detailed look at the corporate identity. Lambie Nairn, who carried out the investigation found that the current slanted logo did not work on screen well, and therefore suggested replacing it with a new logo featuring straightened boxes. The development of this new logo made the old one, still in use on the idents, redundant. Also, as part of this rethink, Lambie Nairn recommended using the BBC logo, with the service name after, instead of unique logos and numerals for each service, as this weakened the core brand. As a result, he suggested that the identity be changed, with personality added through the ident subject rather than a logo. He therefore developed the idea of a hot-air balloon as the new idents. They went into service on 4 October 1997.

See also

 History of BBC television idents

References

External links
 TVARK

BBC One
BBC Idents
Television presentation in the United Kingdom
1991 establishments in the United Kingdom
1991 in British television
Symbols introduced in 1991